Burn the House Down may refer to:

 Burn the House Down (manga), a Japanese manga series
 "Burn the House Down" (song), a song by AJR